The 2021–22 Kent State Golden Flashes men's basketball team represented Kent State University in the 2021–22 NCAA Division I men's basketball season. The Golden Flashes, led by 11th-year head coach Rob Senderoff, played their home games at the Memorial Athletic and Convocation Center, also known as the MAC Center, in Kent, Ohio as members of the Mid-American Conference (MAC). It is the program's 106th season of play and 71st as a member of the MAC.

Previous season
The Golden Flashes finished the 2020–21 season 15–8 overall, 12–6 in MAC play to finish fourth place in conference. They lost to Ohio in the first round of the MAC tournament.

Offseason

Departures

Incoming transfers

Recruiting class

Roster

Schedule and results

|-
!colspan=9 style=| Non-conference regular season

|-
!colspan=9 style=| MAC regular season

|-
!colspan=9 style=| MAC tournament

|-
!colspan=9 style=| The Basketball Classic

Source

References

Kent State Golden Flashes men's basketball seasons
Kent State
Kent State Golden Flashes men's basketball
Kent State Golden Flashes men's basketball
Kent State